1864 Daedalus, provisional designation , is a stony asteroid and near-Earth object of the Apollo group, approximately 3 kilometers in diameter. It was discovered on 24 March 1971, by Dutch–American astronomer Tom Gehrels at Palomar Observatory, California, and named after Daedalus from Greek mythology.

Orbit and classification 

Daedalus is a member of the Apollo asteroids, a group of near-Earth object with an Earth-crossing orbit. It orbits the Sun in the inner main-belt at a distance of 0.6–2.4 AU once every 1 years and 9 months (645 days). Its orbit has an eccentricity of 0.61 and an inclination of 22° with respect to the ecliptic. It has an Earth Minimum orbit intersection distance (MOID) of 0.2693 AU.

Physical characteristics 

Daedalus is a stony asteroid, characterized as an SQ and Sr spectral type in the Tholen and SMASS taxonomy.

Diameter and albedo 

According to the survey carried out by NASA's Wide-field Infrared Survey Explorer with its subsequent NEOWISE mission, it measures 2.7 and 3.7 kilometers in diameter, respectively, and its surface has an albedo of 0.273. The Collaborative Asteroid Lightcurve Link assumes a standard albedo for stony asteroids of 0.20 and derives a diameter of 3.0 kilometers based on an absolute magnitude of 14.98.

Rotation period 

Several rotational lightcurves of Daedalus were obtained by astronomers Tom Gehrels, Petr Pravec and Brian Warner. Lightcurve analysis gave a concurring rotation period of 8.572 hours with a high brightness variation of 0.85–1.04 magnitude, indicating a non-spheroidal shape.

Naming 

This minor planet was named after the Greek mythological figure Daedalus, the builder of King Minos labyrinth, who was subsequently imprisoned there with his son Icarus. They escaped on wings of feathers and wax, but whereas Icarus was drowned when the wax in his wings melted, Daedalus went on to Sicily and built there a temple to Apollo. There is also a lunar crater called Daedalus. The official  was published by the Minor Planet Center on 20 December 1974.

References

External links 
 Asteroid Lightcurve Database (LCDB), query form (info )
 Dictionary of Minor Planet Names, Google books
 Asteroids and comets rotation curves, CdR – Observatoire de Genève, Raoul Behrend
 
 
 

001864
Discoveries by Tom Gehrels
Named minor planets
001864
001864
19710324